Manna from Heaven is a 2002 film written by Gabrielle B. Burton and co-directed by her daughters Gabrielle C. Burton and Maria Burton. The film won awards at four film festivals. It was actor Jerry Orbach's final film before his death from prostate cancer in 2004 and Shelley Duvall's last film prior to her return to acting in 2022.

Plot
Manna From Heaven is a comedic fable about what happens when you get a gift from God (a financial windfall), but many years later you find out it was a just a loan and it's due immediately. Once upon a time, many years ago, a neighborhood in Buffalo, NY is mysteriously showered with 20-dollar bills. Theresa, a young girl who everyone thinks is a saint, doesn't have much trouble convincing her loose-knit "family" that the money is a gift from Heaven. Years later, Theresa, who has become a nun, has an epiphany that it is time to pay the money back, so she calls the eccentric group together to repay the "loan." The problem is, nobody wants to give back the money, nobody has the money, they don't know to whom it belongs, and most of them can't stand each other. Along the way, the characters learn about family, romance, reconciliation and redemption, and by working together they begin to realize their full potential.

Principal cast

Critical reception
Dave Kehr of The New York Times liked the film overall:

References

External links 
 
 

2002 films
Films set in the 1960s
Religious comedy films
2002 comedy films
American comedy films
2000s English-language films
2000s American films